The Nansei Islands subtropical evergreen forests is a terrestrial ecoregion of the Ryukyu Islands, also known as the Nansei Islands, in Japan. The Nansei Islands are an island arc that stretches southwest from Kyushu towards Taiwan. The larger islands are mostly high islands and the smaller ones mostly coral. The largest is Okinawa Island. The highest point is Mount Miyanoura on Yakushima Island at 1,936 metres (6,352 ft).

The ecoregion is the northernmost in the Indomalayan realm, and shares many plants with subtropical and tropical Asia.

Climate
The Nansei Islands have a humid climate, which ranges from subtropical in the north to tropical in the south. The warm Kuroshio Current runs offshore, and sustains coral reefs and the northernmost mangroves in the western Pacific.

Flora
The natural vegetation of the islands is subtropical broadleaf evergreen forest. The dominant trees are Castanopsis sieboldii, Quercus miyagii, Persea thunbergii, and Schima wallichii ssp. liukiuensis. In the mountain forests of Yakushima Island, conifers including Cryptomeria japonica, Chamaecyparis obtusa, Tsuga sieboldii, and Abies firma, are mixed with the broadleaf evergreen trees above 1200 meters elevation.

Coastal and swamp plant communities include plants characteristic of the tropical Pacific, including Ipomoea pes-caprae, Spinifex littoreus, Thespesia populnea, Terminalia catappa, and Macaranga tanarius. Mangrove species include Bruguiera gymnorhiza, Heritiera littoralis, Rhizophora stylosa, Avicennia marina, Sonneratia alba, and Nypa fruticans.

Satakentia liukiuensis, the only species in the genus Satakentia, is a palm tree that is endemic to Ishigaki Island and Iriomote Island in the Yaeyama Islands.

Fauna
The ecoregion corresponds to the Nansei Shoto Endemic Bird Area, and is home to several endemic bird species, including the Ryukyu wood pigeon (Columba jouyi), Ryukyu green pigeon (Treron permagnus), and Ryukyu robin (Larvivora komadori). The Okinawa rail (Gallirallus okinawae) and Okinawa woodpecker (Dendrocopos noguchii) are limited to Okinawa, and the Amami woodcock (Scolopax mira), Amami jay (Garrulus lidthi), and Amami thrush (Zoothera major) are limited to the Amami Islands. The Ryukyu minivet (Pericrocotus tegimae) is formerly endemic, but in recent decades has spread to Kyushu, Shikoku, and western Honshu.

Several threatened species live in the ecoregion and in neighboring ones. The Japanese woodpigeon (Columba janthina) lives in the Nansei Islands, Ogasawara Islands, and islands off Korea's southern coast. The Ryukyu scops owl (Otus elegans) lives in the Nansei Islands as well as Taiwan and Batanes.

Protected areas
Protected areas include Yakushima National Park (325.53 km²) on Yakushima Island, and Yanbaru National Park (136.22 km²) on Okinawa Island.

External links

 Nansei Shoto Endemic Bird Area (BirdLife International)

References

Ecoregions of Japan
Indomalayan ecoregions
.
Forests of Japan
Natural history of the Ryukyu Islands
Tropical and subtropical moist broadleaf forests
Endemic Bird Areas